Selling Innocence is a 2005 television film depicting the exploitation of teenagers on the internet. The film was a co-production among the Edmonton-based television production company ImagiNation, Montreal's Cite-Amerique, and CTV, for CTV's line of television films collectively known as the CTV Signature Series. The film's broadcast premiere was July 2, 2005, on CTV in Canada, and on Lifetime in the United States.

Plot

Mia Sampson (Sarah Lind), an unpopular girl, is approached at the mall one day to become a model. Even though she thinks modeling is shallow, she thinks it will be a better way to earn money than working for a sushi restaurant and goes to the agency. She poses for photographs which are to be displayed on an Internet website for "members only," supposedly so she can be scouted for other modeling jobs. As Mia's membership begins to go up, she begins feeling uncomfortable and also receives disturbing messages from a subscriber known as Gabriel. However, she continues to take shots and even participates in live video chats with the gentlemen of the site. Too late, Mia realizes that she is working for a pornography site and goes to a group called webwatch to uncover the operation. However, since the agency isn't doing anything illegal, the police can't do anything.

Mia is disgusted and even though she has earned over 30,000 dollars, she quits, after finding out that a girl younger than her has been hired. Her boss, however, still has full legal rights to her photos and tells her he will keep the website up, as she is the site's most popular "model." He does offer, though, to take down the site if Mia will do a 15-minute live web show whose clients have offered a lot of money to see. Mia accepts, as a man at the webwatch station has told her that it will be the evidence the police need to take down the operation. Mia begins the show, but when the police don't show up she cannot bear to finish the show and runs to the webwatch station. The man at the webwatch station is enraged that she didn't finish; he is Gabriel. He tries to force her to finish the show for him privately while he records it, but Mia tries to escape. Luckily, Mia's mom and boyfriend show up as he is attacking her.

The film ends with Mia working at a fast food restaurant, her safety restored, the "agency" shut down, and Gabriel behind bars. However, the ending shot shows a teenage boy going through old photos that Mia had done that are still online – proving what her boss stated earlier in the film to her that, whether she quits or not, the girl she became will always be out there.

Cast
Mimi Rogers – Abby Sampson
J. R. Bourne – Malcolm Lowe
Sarah Lind – Mia Sampson
Tamara Hope – Chelsea Burns
Mike Lobel – Justin Johnson
Joanne Kelly – Simone
Fred Ewanuick – James
Charisse Baker – Jen Wilson
Alexz Johnson – Angel DeSousa
Emma Paetz – Stephanie Walker
Margherita Donato – Bridget
Nicky Pugh – Naomi
Patrick Gilmore – Karl
Jonathan Lachlan-Stewart – Jock in Cafeteria

External links
 
 CTV.ca
 https://web.archive.org/web/20080303081415/http://www.imaginationfilm.tv/projects/productions/SIN/

2005 television films
2005 films
English-language Canadian films
2005 drama films
Canadian drama television films
2000s English-language films
2000s Canadian films